The University of Central Florida College of Business Administration is an academic college of the University of Central Florida located in Orlando, Florida, United States. The dean of the college is Paul Jarley, Ph.D.

The College of Business Administration offers programs in accounting, economics, finance, business administration, management, marketing, real estate and taxation, which were developed in response to the demands of the Central Florida community. The curriculum focuses on specific competencies that are integrated throughout all coursework: Teamwork, Communication, Creativity, Adaptation to Change, Diversity, and Ethics.

History and academics
Established in 1968, the college offers degrees at the bachelor’s, master’s, doctoral, and executive levels. All programs, as well as the Kenneth G. Dixon School of Accounting are accredited by the Association to Advance Collegiate Schools of Business.   The Master of Science in Real Estate program is the newest program in the school.

The college was named one of the best undergraduate business programs by Bloomberg BusinessWeek, and in 2007 was ranked among the best 282 business schools by The Princeton Review. The Wall Street Journal ranks the DeVos Sport Business Management program among the top five in the nation. In the 2010 Best 301 Business Schools compilation, the Princeton Review ranked the UCF College of Business Administration's MBA program among the nation’s top 10 “best administered” programs. Also in 2010, Bloomberg BusinessWeek ranked the UCF College of Business Administration as the number one public business school for return on investment in the nation., and the college was named "Readers' Choice" for best business school in Central Florida to receive an MBA by Orlando Business Journal readers.

Organization
The college is composed of seven academic departments:
Kenneth G. Dixon School of Accounting
Economics Department
Finance Department
Management Department
Department of Marketing
Dr. P. Phillips School of Real Estate
DeVos Sport Business Management Department (graduate-only)

References

External links
UCF College of Business Administration
University of Central Florida Official Web site
Official Facebook page
Official Twitter site

Business Administration
Educational institutions established in 1968
1968 establishments in Florida
Business schools in Florida